is a novel by the Japanese author Natsume Sōseki. It was first published in 1914 in serial form in the Japanese newspaper Asahi Shimbun. The title translated literally means "heart". The word contains shades of meaning—notions of the heart and also of mind—and can be translated as "affection", "spirit", "resolve", "courage", "sentiment", or "the heart of things". During the novel's initial serial run, from April 20 to August 11, 1914, it was printed under the title .  When later published in novel form by Iwanami Shoten, its title was shortened to Kokoro; the rendering of the word "kokoro" itself was also changed from kanji (心) to hiragana (こころ). 

Along with Osamu Dazai's No Longer Human, Kokoro is one of the best-selling novels of all time in Japan, having sold more than seven million copies in the country as of 2016.

Premise
The work deals with the transition from the Japanese Meiji society to the modern era, by exploring the friendship between a young man and an older man he calls "Sensei" ("teacher" or "master"). It continues the theme of isolation developed in Natsume's immediately preceding works, here in the context of interwoven strands of egotism and guilt, as opposed to shame. Other important themes in the novel include the changing times (particularly the modernization of Japan in the Meiji era), the changing roles and ideals of women, and intergenerational change in values, the role of family, the importance of the self versus the group, the cost of weakness, and identity.

Structure
Kokoro is written as three parts. The first two are told from the perspective of the narrator, relating his memories of Sensei, an older man who was a friend and mentor during his university days. Part three, which makes up the latter half of the novel, is a long confessional letter written by Sensei to the narrator. In this letter Sensei reveals, in keeping with an earlier promise, the full story of his past.

Plot

"Part I – “Sensei and I"
The narrator has been left on his own in Kamakura after his friend, who invited him to vacation there, is called home by his family. One day, after finishing his usual swim in the sea, he takes notice of a man in the changing house who's there with a foreign guest, preparing to head for the water. He sees the same man each day thereafter, though no longer with his foreign companion. After some days, he finds occasion to make the man's acquaintance. As they grow closer, he comes to refer to the man as “Sensei.”

On parting in Kamakura, as Sensei prepares to return home to Tokyo, the narrator asks if he can call on Sensei at his home sometime. He receives an affirmative, though less enthusiastic than hoped for, response. Several weeks after his own return to Tokyo, he makes an initial visit, only to find Sensei away. On his next visit, when he again finds Sensei away, he learns from Sensei's wife that Sensei makes monthly visits to the gravesite of a friend.

Over subsequent months and years, through periodic visits, the narrator comes to know Sensei and his wife quite well. At the same time, Sensei insists on maintaining a certain distance. He refuses to talk of his deceased friend and is reluctant to explain his own reclusion and lack of occupation. He also cautions the narrator that intimacy and admiration will only lead to future disillusionment and disdain. However, he does promise that one day, when the time is right, he will divulge in full the story of his past.

"Part II – “My Parents and I"
The narrator returns home to the country after graduation. His father, who had been in ill health, is up and about, enjoying a respite from his illness. They set a date for a graduation celebration, only to have their plans put on hold by news of the Meiji Emperor falling ill. As the weeks go by, the narrator's father gradually loses his vigor and becomes bedridden. From his bed, he follows the papers as the Emperor declines and then passes away.

After the Emperor's passing, the narrator is pressured by his mother to secure employment to put his father at ease. At the same time, his father's condition holds him close to home in the country. At his mother's urging, he writes to Sensei to request assistance in finding a position in Tokyo. While not expecting any favorable response on the matter of employment, he does at least expect some reply and is disappointed when none arrives. Summer wears on, and the rest of the family is summoned home in anticipation of the father's final hour. All are moved when news comes of the suicide (junshi) of General Nogi Maresuke, who takes his own life to follow his Emperor (the Meiji Emperor) in death.

Shortly thereafter, a telegram from Sensei arrives, summoning the narrator to Tokyo. Unable to leave his father, the narrator refuses Sensei's request, first by telegram and then by a letter detailing his situation. Some days later, a thick letter arrives by registered mail from Sensei. Stealing away from his father's bedside, the narrator opens the letter to find it's the previously-promised accounting of Sensei's past. Leafing through the pages, a line near the end catches his eye. “By the time this letter reaches you, I’ll be gone from this world.  I’ll have already passed away.”

Rushing to the station, the narrator boards the first train for Tokyo. Once on board, he takes out Sensei's letter and reads it through from the start.

"Part III – “Sensei’s Testament"
This latter part of the novel is related by Sensei in the form of his long written testament that the narrator is reading aboard the train as he steams toward Tokyo. Sensei begins by explaining his reticence over the summer as he wrestled with the problem of his own continued existence. He then explains the motivation for his current actions. The remainder of the letter is an accounting of Sensei's life.

Sensei grows up in the countryside and loses both of his parents to illness while still in his late teens. As an only child, he inherits the family's considerable wealth, which his uncle steps in to help manage during the years over which, as previously planned, he pursues his education in Tokyo. Each summer Sensei returns home to the country. On each such return, his uncle suggests that Sensei should marry soon and establish himself in the community as the family heir. Uninterested yet in marriage, Sensei declines to commit. As the years go on, pressure from the uncle intensifies. Then finally, the uncle proposes his own daughter, Sensei's cousin, as the bride. After Sensei's continued refusal, it comes to light that the uncle's businesses are struggling, and much of Sensei's wealth has been poured into losing ventures. Sensei, now learning the truth of his situation, salvages what remains, arranges for the sale of his house and possessions, visits his parents’ gravesite one last time, and turns his back on his home town, severing all ties with his relations.

Back at his studies in Tokyo, and now with his own assets in hand, Sensei decides to trade his boisterous student lodgings for calmer quarters. Walking the surrounding hills, he's referred by a local shop owner to the home of a widow looking to take in a boarder. The household is quiet, with just the widow, her daughter, and a maidservant. After a brief interview, the widow accepts Sensei as her boarder. Sensei is smitten with the daughter at first sight, but at the same time the deceit of his uncle has left him generally distrustful. The widow takes to him and treats him as family, helping to sooth his nerves and draw him out. After some time, he thinks to ask the widow for her daughter's hand but still holds back for fear that the widow, or the widow and her daughter in collusion, are playing him just as his uncle had.

Sensei has a friend and classmate, whom he refers to simply as K, who hails from the same home town and with whom he shared a common dormitory during his first years of study in Tokyo. K is the second son of a Buddhist priest but was sent to the family of a prominent local physician as an adoptive son. His adoptive family funds his study of medicine in Tokyo, but contrary to their wishes, K pursues his own passions of religion and philosophy. After his third year in Tokyo, he confesses his deception and is disowned as a result. Sensei feels some obligation to assist his friend, who is struggling to maintain an aggressive course of study while at the same time supporting himself. K views himself as an ascetic and strongly declines any form of financial assistance. Finally, Sensei convinces K to join him in his lodgings, arguing that K's presence there will serve toward his own spiritual betterment. After some persuasion on Sensei's part to win the widow's approval, K joins Sensei in the widow's home as a second boarder. After a while, with Sensei working behind the scenes, K warms to his new surroundings, emerges from his ascetic shell, and grows more sociable. Sensei is pleased with the improvement he's worked in his friend's demeanor but also begins to see K as a rival for the daughter's affection.

In the summer before their final year of studies, Sensei and K set out together on a walking tour of the Boshu peninsula. They follow the shoreline from village to village, trudging under the hot sun and cooling themselves from time to time in the sea. All the while, Sensei is tormented by suspicions. He wonders if K might not have his eye on the daughter, and he fears that the daughter may in fact favor K. He longs to divulge to K his feelings for the daughter, but he lacks the courage to do so. Sensei and K return to Tokyo, blackened by the sun and haggard from days of trekking.

Autumn comes and classes begin again. Sensei returns home at times to find K and the daughter conversing amiably, and he worries they’re growing close. He thinks again to ask the widow for her daughter's hand, but again holds back, this time for fear that K holds the daughter's affection. Finally, during the New Year's holiday, things come to a head when the widow and her daughter leave home for the day to call on a relative. K comes into Sensei's room, joins him at his hibachi, and after a pained silence forces out a confession of his love for the daughter. Sensei, shocked and dismayed, is unable to muster a response.

Sensei kicks himself for not at least having countered K's confession with his own. Through subsequent conversation, though, he finds some solace in learning that K's sentiments are known only to the two of them and not to the ladies. In the days that follow, K either cannot or will not articulate his intentions, and Sensei's anxiety persists. Finally, K seeks out Sensei's counsel, confiding that he's torn between his long-held ideals and his newfound passion. Sensing K's vulnerability, and at the same time seeking to serve his own interest, Sensei berates K, throwing back at him his own words on discipline and servitude to a cause. K asks that Sensei speak no more on the subject and withdraws into reticence. Sensei fears that K is preparing to shift his life's course out of love for the daughter. Resolving to preempt K's actions, he feigns illness, staying home for time alone with the widow. After confirming that K has not yet approached her, Sensei asks the widow for her daughter's hand. She acquiesces, and the matter is easily settled. That same day, the widow talks to her daughter. Within the household, only K remains unaware of what's transpired.

Days pass, with Sensei loathe to disclose to K what he's done. Finally, it comes to light that the widow has spoken to K and been surprised by his reaction. She scolds Sensei for leaving his friend in the dark. Sensei resolves to talk with K the next morning, but he never gets the chance. During the night, K takes his own life. K leaves behind a note, but absent is the rebuke that Sensei dreads. K's feelings for the daughter, along with Sensei's betrayal of his friend's trust, are forever safe from the world.

Sensei notifies K's family and proceeds to settle affairs as requested in K's final note. He suggests that K be interred in the nearby Zoshigaya cemetery, and K's family agrees.  Sensei and the ladies relocate shortly thereafter to a new house. Sensei finishes his studies, and half a year later weds the daughter. Sensei makes monthly pilgrimages to K's grave. His betrayal of K, and K's death, continue to cast a shadow over his married life, yet he remains unable to burden his wife with his secret. Having lost faith in humanity in general, and now in his own self, Sensei withdraws from the world to lead an idle life. As the years pass and he reflects further on K, he comes to realize that K's suicide was less about lost love and more about alienation and disappointment in oneself. Sensei feels himself drawn, more and more, to follow K's path. With the ending of the Meiji era and the passing of General Nogi, Sensei decides that he's outlived his time and must part from the world. His final request to the narrator is that his wife never know his story, that it be held private until after she's gone.

Critiques
Although Sensei feels guilt for having caused his friend's death, he comes to believe that K's death was not a direct consequence of his unhappiness in love, but rather the same loneliness from which Sensei himself suffers. Similarly, in the view of most critics, "psychological guilt [is] less important than philosophical isolation". McClellan traces the theme of seeking relief from isolation through Sōseki's earlier works of The Gate and Kojin to its solution in Sensei's suicide in Kokoro.

Even though guilt comes into play, taking responsibility for one's actions and mistakes is paramount in the Confucian and Japanese ideology portrayed in the novel, and Sensei understands those traditions.  Sensei clearly feels responsible for K's suicide, displayed in his constant trips to the cemetery at Zoshigaya to visit K's grave, his belief that he is being punished by heaven, or is destined for misery and loneliness,  his belief that he must never be, or can never be, happy, because of this betrayal of K.  Thus, as is often the case in Japanese culture (particularly in the Tokugawa period, but also certainly carried on beyond it), Sensei's suicide is an apology and an attempt to show penitence, or to do something about one's mistakes.  He writes on several occasions that he has long known he must die, but has not the strength to kill himself just yet.  He is constrained by weakness, and has not the strength to hold to either those traditional Japanese values, or the new modern Western ones that were fast replacing them throughout the Meiji era.

Jun Etō attributes the focus on isolation in Sōseki's work to a philosophical crisis which the author underwent while studying in London. His contact with the more individualistic ideas of the West shattered his faith in the Confucian scholar-administrator model of traditional Japan, but he retained enough of his traditional upbringing to preclude a wholehearted embrace of Western thinking; leaving him, "a lonely, modern man". The fallen man of Soseki's conception could only escape through madness or suicide, or live on and continue to suffer.

Doi Takeo provides a contrasting interpretation of the novel, in which the psychological dominates and which sees Sensei's life as a descent into first madness, then suicide. Noting inconsistencies in Sensei's account of his uncle's fraud, he argues that Sensei's perception of his uncle's behaviour was a schizophrenic delusion created by changes in Sensei himself. He finds further confirmation of this assessment in Sensei's belief that he is being first persecuted, then entrapped by the family he goes to live with, and in the voice which Sensei says talked to him in the years after K's suicide. Sensei's own end he interprets as a homoerotic act, "loyally following his beloved into death".

Although Sensei's story is the climax of the novel, about half its length is devoted to the story of the narrator. Many commentators have noted the similarity between the narrator and the younger Sensei. The narrator is at an earlier stage in his own transition from a simplistic celebration of life in the opening pages to his own growing separation from mankind. The extent of the latter becomes apparent when he returns home to find that he is no longer in sympathy with his own family.

This second part of the novel, in which Sensei is physically absent, also serves as a contrast between the unthinking contentment of the narrator's father and the thoughtful discontent of Sensei. McClellan compares the "strength and dignity" of K's and Sensei's suicides with the physical indignity of the father's death, while still noting the tranquility the father manages to retain. Doi Takeo in his psychological readings sees the narrator's preference for Sensei over his real father — culminating in the abandonment of his dying father for the already dead Sensei — as a case of "father transference".

There has been much debate over the reasons for Sensei's eventual suicide. Eto Jun ascribes to it a "dual motivation": a personal desire to end his years of egoistic suffering, and a public desire to demonstrate his loyalty to the emperor. This position is supported by Sensei's own statement (albeit in jest) that his suicide would be, "through loyalty to the spirit of the Meiji era", while earlier in the book he had explicitly connected his isolation with the times he lived in: "loneliness is the price we have to pay for being born in this modern age, so full of freedom, independence, and our own egotistical selves". Isamu Fukuchi, however, contests both these points. He argues that suicide to end his own suffering would make no sense after having already endured the suffering for many years, while a distinction is to be made between loyalty to the Meiji emperor and loyalty to the spirit of the Meiji era. He sees the latter as being the conflict between, "modern ideals and traditional morality". Sensei's suicide is therefore a recognition that the end of the Meiji era has rendered as anachronisms those who, like him, are torn between modernity and tradition.

Translations
Kokoro has been translated into English in 1941 by Ineko Kondo, in 1957 by Edwin McClellan, and in 2010 by Meredith McKinney.

Adaptations
 The Heart, a 1955 film by Kon Ichikawa
 The Heart, a 1973 film by Kaneto Shindō

The novel has also been repeatedly adapted for television. Additionally, it has been adapted into an anime film (Aoi Bungaku series), mangas (Nariko Enomoto and the Manga de Dokuha series) and satirised in a comic strip (Step Aside Pops, Kate Beaton).

Notes

References

External links
 Kokoro (Translated by Edwin McClellan) at Google Books
 Soseki Project  (resources for reading Sōseki's works in their original Japanese form)
  

1914 novels
Japanese novels adapted into films
Novels by Natsume Sōseki
Novels set in Japan
Japanese serial novels